Gregor Samsa was the debut EP released in 2002 by Virginian Post-rock band, Gregor Samsa.

Track listing
 "◯" – 4:02
 "◯◯" – 8:31
 "◯◯◯ [Dm0]" – 5:36

Contributors
Champ Bennett - guitar, vocals
Nikki King - Rhodes piano, keyboard, vocals
Nick Wurz - bass, bowed electric bass
Nathan Altice - guitar, keyboard
Earl Yevak - drums

References

External links
[ Preview Gregor Samsa on Allmusic]

2002 EPs
Gregor Samsa (band) albums